Brown stew chicken, also referred to as stew chicken, is a dish typically eaten for dinner throughout the English-speaking Caribbean islands. The dish is popular in Jamaica, Antigua, Trinidad and Tobago, Barbados, Saint Lucia, Grenada, Belize, Dominica and in Caribbean communities throughout the world. The eponymous colour is achieved by browning the chicken in brown sugar, which creates a rich gravy to which vegetables like onions, garlic and carrots are added.

See also
 
 Jamaican cuisine
 Trinidad and Tobago cuisine
 Culture of Saint Lucia
 Dominica cuisine
 Culture of Grenada
 Barbadian cuisine
 Antigua and Barbuda cuisine
 Belizean cuisine
 British African-Caribbean people
 List of chicken dishes
 List of stews

References

Meat stews
Caribbean chicken dishes
Jamaican cuisine
Trinidad and Tobago cuisine
Grenadian cuisine
Barbadian cuisine
Saint Lucian cuisine
Antigua and Barbuda cuisine
Belizean cuisine